The 2021–22 Liga Primera de Nicaragua season was to be divided into two tournaments, Apertura and Clausura. The season will determine the 77th and 78th champions in the history of the Liga Primera de Nicaragua, the top division of football in Nicaragua. The Apertura tournament is to be played in the second half of 2021, while the Clausura is to be played in the first half of 2022.

Teams

Team information 

A total of ten teams contested the league, including nine sides from the 2020–21 Primera División, and one side from the 2020–21 Segunda División.

Junior Managua finished last in the aggregate table and were relegated to the Segunda División. The champions from the Segunda División, UNAN Managua, were promoted in their place.

The 9th place team in the aggregate table, Chinandega FC, faced the second-place team from the Segunda División, HyH Export de Sébaco, in a playoff for a spot in the Primera División. HyH Export de Sébaco won 5–3 over two legs, meaning Chinandega FC relegated from the Primera División.

Promotion and relegation 

Promoted from Segunda División as of July, 2021.

 Champions: UNAN Managua
 Promotion playoff winner: HyH Export de Sébaco

Relegated to Segunda División  as of May, 2021.

 Last Place: Junior Managua
 Promotion playoff loser: Chinandega FC

Stadiums and locations

Personnel and kits

Other News

New Ball Provider
VOIT will be providing and major ball sponsor for 2020-2021

Managerial Changes

Pre Season Apertura 2021

During the Apertura season

Pre Season Clausura 2022

During the Clausura season

Apertura 2021

Finals 
 Qualified teams
 Diriangén
 Real Estelí

Final

First leg

Second leg

Clausura 2022

Personnel and kits

Finals

Quarterfinals 

Walter Ferretti progressed.
* Originally ART Jalapa had qualified however due to using five foreign players on the field at one time, which exceeded the rule which only allowed 4 players. ART Jalapa were stripped the victory therefore allowed H&H Sebaco to overtake them on the table

Managua FC progressed.

Semi-finals 

Walter Ferretti won 4-3 on aggregate.

Diriangen won 2-1 on aggregate.

Finals

Final

First leg

Second leg

2-2. Diriangen won 4-2 on penalties.

Aggregate table

List of foreign players in the league 
This is a list of foreign players in the 2020–21 season. The following players:

 Have played at least one game for the respective club.
 Have not been capped for the Nicaragua national football team on any level, independently from the birthplace

A new rule was introduced this season, that clubs can have four foreign players per club and can only add a new player if there is an injury or a player/s is released, and it is before the closing of the season transfer window.

ART Jalapa
  David Pinilla
  Jafet del Portillo
  Allan Medina

Diriangén
  Jonathan Pacheco
  Carlos Tórres
  Robinson Luiz
  Bernando Laureiro
  Jhon Mosquera

Juventus Managua
  Kevin Obregón
  Bernardo Gradilla
  Rafael Vieira 
  Alexander Moreno
  Carlos Felix

HYH Sebaco
  Miguel Pucharella (*)
  Sebastián Barquero (*)
  Brayan Zúñiga (*)
  Miguel Soza (*)

Managua
  Lucas Dos Santos 
  Edward Morillo
  Leandro Barbosa 
  Pablo Gállego 
  Luciano Sanhueza
  Federico Vasilchick 
  Carlos López Quintero

Ocotal
  Kenverlen López
  Gabriel Ortiz
  Carlos Daniel Duran
  Ricardo Medina

Real Estelí
  Luis Acuna
  Lautaro Ceratto
  Vitor Faiska
  Vinicius da Souza
  Bidari Garcia

Real Madriz
  Jamilton Moreno
  Nicolas Quinonez
  Bryan Mojica
  Kevin Castro (*)
  Edwin Castro (*)
  Santiago Paredes (*)
  TBD

UNAM Managua
  Joseph Donkor (*)
  Donouvi Blaise (*)

Walter Ferretti
  Brian Calabrese (*) 
  Carlos Castro (*)
  Maykel Reyes (*)
  Taufic Guarch (*)
  Diego Casas (*)

 (player released during the Apertura season)
 (player released between the Apertura and Clausura seasons)
 (player released during the Clausura season)

External links
Fútbol de Primera – Futbol Nica

Nicaraguan Primera División seasons
1
Nicaragua